Memorial Gym is a 5,200-seat multi-purpose arena in El Paso, Texas.  It opened in December 1961, replacing Holliday Hall, and was home to the Texas Western College Miners basketball teams, until the Don Haskins Center, then known as the Special Events Center, opened in 1977, by which time Texas Western had changed its name to the current University of Texas at El Paso.  Memorial Gym was the home court of the 1966 Texas Western basketball team that won the NCAA title, using five black starters to defeat Adolph Rupp's all-white Kentucky squad.  Since 1974 Memorial Gym has been home to UTEP women's volleyball.  Memorial Gym hosted the first and second rounds of the 2011 Conference USA Women's basketball tournament.

References

Defunct college basketball venues in the United States
UTEP Miners basketball venues
Sports venues in El Paso, Texas
College volleyball venues in the United States
Volleyball venues in Texas
1961 establishments in Texas
Sports venues completed in 1961
Basketball venues in Texas